Md. Mejbauddin Farhad (born 25  August 1963) is a Bangladesh Nationalist Party politician and a former Jatiya Sangsad member representing the Barisal-4 constituency during 2009-2014.

Career
Farhad was elected to parliament from Barisal-4 as a Bangladesh Nationalist Party candidate in 2008.

References

Living people
1963 births
Bangladesh Nationalist Party politicians
9th Jatiya Sangsad members
Place of birth missing (living people)